Penn Central Transportation Co. v. New York City, 438 U.S. 104 (1978), was a landmark United States Supreme Court decision on compensation for regulatory takings.

Events leading up to the case

New York City Landmarks Law
The New York City Landmarks Law was signed into effect by Mayor Robert F. Wagner, Jr., in 1965. This law was passed after New York citizens grew concerned over the loss of culturally significant structures such as Pennsylvania Station, demolished in 1963. The Landmarks Law's purpose is to protect structures that are significant to the city and still retain their ability to be properly used. This law is enforced by the New York City Landmarks Preservation Commission.

Railroad decline
Use of railroad systems saw its peak in the 1920s and began to falter in the mid-to-late 1930s.  World War II revitalized use of the railroad systems in the early 1940s and brought the industry back to prior success. While this period saw nearly half of Americans using the railroad systems, by the late 1940s, there was once again a steep decline in railroad use. That put many of the railroad companies out of business and left others to find new ways to increase revenue.

Early proposals to replace Grand Central Terminal
In 1954, the New York Central Railroad began to look at proposed plans to replace Grand Central Terminal. Early designs by William Zeckendorf and I. M. Pei included an ambitious 80-story,  tower that would be over  taller than the Empire State Building. None of the early designs ever made it past the sketch phase and, for the time being, all plans to replace Grand Central Terminal were abandoned.

The Pan Am Building
In 1958, Erwin S. Wolfson created proposals to replace Grand Central Terminal's six-story office building just north of the Terminal. Erwin S. Wolfson developed the project in the early 1960s with the assistance of the architects Emery Roth and Sons, Walter Gropius and Pietro Belluschi. The Pan Am Building was completed in 1963 and bought Grand Central Terminal more time away from proposed reconstructions.

New York Central Railroad merger with Pennsylvania Railroad
Despite increased office space, the New York Central Railroad found itself facing bankruptcy in 1967 because of continued decline in railroad use. The Pennsylvania Railroad found itself in a similar position after the offices that were built following the demolition of Pennsylvania Station were no longer bringing the company sufficient income.

In 1968, the New York Central Railroad merged with the Pennsylvania Railroad to create the Penn Central Railroad company. The newly formed Penn Central began to look into updating the uses of the Grand Central Terminal to increase revenue and save the company from financial straits.

Plans to build on top of Grand Central Terminal
In mid-1968, the Penn Central Railroad unveiled two designs by Marcel Breuer, one of which would potentially be built atop Grand Central Terminal. The first design (Breuer I) was a 55-story tall office building to be constructed on top of Grand Central. That building was to be cantilevered above the existing structure allowing Grand Central to maintain its facade. The second design (Breuer II) called for the demolition of one of the sides of Grand Central in order to create a unified facade for a new 53-story office building. Both designs were submitted to the New York City Landmarks Preservation Commission after the structures met city zoning laws.

Landmarks Preservation Commission's rejections
Upon reviewing the submitted designs for Grand Central Terminal, the Landmarks Preservation Commission rejected the plans on September 20, 1968. Penn Central then filed for a Certificate of Appropriateness for both proposals but was again denied. The Landmarks Preservation Commission summarized their reason for rejecting both plans:

Breuer I 

Breuer II

The Landmarks Preservation Commission offered Penn Central the Transfer of Development Rights (TDRs) to allow them to sell the air space above Grand Central Terminal to other developers for their own use. Penn Central felt this was not enough to be considered just compensation for the loss of their land use.

State case

Penn Central files suit
After the New York City Landmark Preservation Commission rejected Penn Central's proposals for construction of a high rise building atop Grand Central Terminal, Penn Central filed suit against the city, arguing that under the New York Historical Preservation Law, it was entitled to a reasonable return on the value of its property, whereas in the existing condition, Grand Central Terminal could not break even and because (a) as a regulated railroad it could not go out of business, and (b) it was in bankruptcy, it could not cease the deficit-causing operations, thus suffering a taking of its property, for which it was entitled to compensation. The trial court agreed.

In a novel opinion that revisited some of Henry George's ideas, it ruled that in New York, a property owner was entitled to a return only on that increment of the property's value that was created by private entrepreneurship, not on the entire property's value. The court then affirmed the Appellate Division but, unaccountably, also granted Penn Central the opportunity to try the facts that would have to underlie the newly minted Court of Appeals holding.

Since this would have been impossible (Chief Judge Breitel later, in an extrajudicial statement, likened it to a search for the Holy Grail), and since the Court of Appeals conceded that such a task presented "impenetrable densities" and would require Penn Central to separate the inseparable, Penn Central sought review by the U.S. Supreme Court on a different legal theory.

Supreme Court decision

In the United States Supreme Court, Penn Central changed theories. Instead of arguing that it was not receiving a reasonable return on its property because of the city regulations, it argued that the regulation took its air rights above Grand Central Terminal, which had been designed to accommodate a twenty-story building on top of it. The Supreme Court disagreed and held that under a new taking test that it formulated in this opinion, the economic impact on Penn Central was not severe enough to constitute a taking because Penn Central conceded that it could still continue with its present use whose return was reasonable. Thus, the regulation did not interfere with its reasonable investment-backed expectations. The court therefore found that the city's restrictions on Grand Central Terminal did not amount to a taking.

The case is perhaps best summarized in Section II-C of the Opinion of the Court.

The dissent argued that in this case there was a net transfer from Penn Central to the city. The dissent argued that it was not fair to have the entire burden of preserving Grand Central fall on its owners. That cost is the opportunity cost of not developing the airspace over the terminal.

Aftermath
Penn Central lost its trial, but was in bankruptcy by this time and lacked the funds to maintain Grand Central Terminal, which fell into disrepair. Eventually, the Metropolitan Transportation Authority assumed responsibility and restored it at public expense.

See also
List of United States Supreme Court cases, volume 438
Grand Central Terminal
Penn Central
Tahoe-Sierra Preservation Council, Inc. v. Tahoe Regional Planning Agency (2002)

References

Bibliography 

Gideon Kanner, Making Laws and Sausages: A Quarter-Century Retrospective on Penn Central Transportation Co. v. City of New York. 13 William & Mary Bill of Rights Journal 653 (2005)
Schlichting, Kurt C. Grand Central Terminal: Railroads, Engineering, and Architecture in New York City. Baltimore, MD: JHU P, 2001.
PENN CENTRAL TRANSP. CO. V. NEW YORK CITY. No. 438 U.S. 104. US Supreme Court. 26 June 1978.
"Grand Central Station." Archiseek. 2007. The American Institute of Architects. 12 May 2008 <https://web.archive.org/web/20080724104921/http://usa.archiseek.com/newyork/newyork/grandcentralstation.html>.
Duerksen, Christopher J. A Handbook on Historic Preservation Law. Baltimore, MD: Conservation Foundation, 1983. 351-376.
Davis, Christina R. "About LPC." New York City Landmarks Preservation Commission. 2008. Government of New York City. 11 May 2008 <http://www.nyc.gov/html/lpc/html/about/about.shtml>.
"Grand Central Terminal." New York Architecture Images. 10 May 2008 <http://www.nyc-architecture.com/MID/MID031.htm>.
Kayden, Jerold S. "Celebrating Penn Central." Planning Magazine June 2003.
Miller, Julia H. A Layperson's Guide to Historic Preservation Law. Washington D.C.: National Trust, 2000. 22-27.
"Penn Central History." Penn Central Railroad Historical Society 4 April 2008. TainWeb.Com. 15 May 2008 <https://web.archive.org/web/20080604231315/http://www.pcrrhs.org/history.html>.
Schlichting, Kurt C. Grand Central Terminal: Railroads, Engineering, and Architecture in New York City. Baltimore, MD: JHU P, 2001.
"The MetLife Building." Tishman Speyer. 2008. 12 May 2008 <http://www.tishmanspeyer.com/properties/Property.aspx?id=57>.
Weiss, Lois. "Air Rights Case Headed for Supreme Ct. Review - Transferable Development Rights for Grand Central Terminal, New York, New York." Real Estate Weekly 4 May 1994.
Boyd, Lydia, and Lynn Pritcher. "Brief History of the U.S. Passenger Rail Industry." Duke University Libraries: Digital Collection. 25 January   2008. Duke University. 10 May 2008 <https://web.archive.org/web/20080501041925/http://library.duke.edu/digitalcollections/adaccess/rails-history.html>.
Dukeminier, Jesse, James E. Krier, Gregory S. Alexander, & Michael H. Schill."Property" 6th ed. Aspen Publishers. New York: 2006.

External links
 

United States Supreme Court cases
United States Supreme Court cases of the Burger Court
Takings Clause case law
United States land use case law
1978 in United States case law
History of New York City
1978 in New York City
Penn Central Transportation
Grand Central Terminal
New York City Landmarks Preservation Commission
City of New York litigation